The Pere Marquette is a passenger train operated by Amtrak as part of its Michigan Services on the  route between Grand Rapids, Michigan, and Chicago, Illinois. It is funded in part by the Michigan Department of Transportation and is train 370 eastbound and train 371 westbound. The westbound train leaves Grand Rapids during the morning rush, with the eastbound train leaving Chicago after the afternoon rush, enabling same-day business travel between the two cities.

The train is named for a named train of the defunct Pere Marquette Railway, and in turn for Pere Marquette, Michigan, an early name for Ludington. The town was named for Father Jacques Marquette, a French explorer of the Great Lakes region.

Route

The Pere Marquette operates over Norfolk Southern Railway and CSX Transportation trackage:
Norfolk Southern between Chicago and Porter, Indiana
CSX between Porter, Indiana and Grand Rapids

History
The original Pere Marquette was a named train of the Pere Marquette Railway, which ran between Detroit and Grand Rapids six times a day. It was extended to Chicago in 1947 when the Pere Marquette Railway was absorbed into the Chesapeake and Ohio Railway. Service ended on April 30, 1971, the day before Amtrak took over intercity rail service in the country.

Amtrak revived the name for a new Grand Rapids–Chicago service on August 5, 1984, with financial support from the state of Michigan. Initially it served Chicago, Hammond–Whiting, New Buffalo, St. Joseph, Bangor, Holland and Grand Rapids. Service at Hammond–Whiting ended April 29, 2001 (although the Wolverine still stops there). Service at New Buffalo ended October 26, 2009, when a new station opened on a different alignment. The 1984-opened station in Grand Rapids was replaced with Vernon J. Ehlers Station on a new spur line in 2014.

On November 30, 2007, the southbound Pere Marquette collided with a Norfolk Southern freight train in Chicago, injuring 71 people. The National Transportation Safety Board (NTSB) determined that the probable cause of the collision was the failure of the Amtrak engineer to interpret the signal at Englewood interlocking correctly and Amtrak's failure to ensure that the engineer had the competence to interpret signals correctly across the different territories over which he operated. The NTSB released its findings on the crash on March 31, 2009.

In March 2020, the Pere Marquette was suspended indefinitely as part of a round of service reduction in response to the ongoing COVID-19 pandemic. The train returned on June 29 with the eastbound run to Grand Rapids, with full service in both directions resuming on June 30. In the interim, Grand Rapids' only connection to the national system was an Amtrak Thruway Motorcoach that connected with the Wolverine at Kalamazoo.

Around 2021, MDOT initiated the design and engineering needed to connect the Amtrak Michigan Line to the CSX tracks north of New Buffalo station. This would allow the Pere Marquette to serve New Buffalo, providing a connection to Blue Water and Wolverine Service trains. It would also allow for  service on the Pere Marquette between New Buffalo, Michigan and Porter, Indiana.

Equipment

A typical Pere Marquette consists of:
One Siemens Charger locomotive or GE P42DC (lead) 
One married pair of Siemens Venture coach cars and one Amfleet or Horizon Café / Business car

Station stops

References

Notes

Further reading

External links

Amtrak routes
Passenger rail transportation in Illinois
Passenger rail transportation in Indiana
Passenger rail transportation in Michigan
West Michigan
Railway services introduced in 1984